Émile Gaston Chassinat (5 May 1868 - 26 May 1948) was a French Egyptologist. Director of the French Institute for Oriental Archaeology in Cairo in Cairo from 1898/9 to 1911/2, Chassinat acquired two of the Amarna tablets in 1903.

Publications 

 With H. Gauthier et H. Pieron, Fouilles de Qattah, MIFAO, Le Caire, 1906.
 Catalogue des signes hiéroglyphiques de l'imprimerie de l'Institut français du Caire, IFAO, Le Caire, 1907-1912-1915-1930.
  With C. Palanque,  Une campagne de fouilles dans la nécropole d'Assiout, n°24, MIFAO, Le Caire, 1911.
 Supplément au catalogue des signes hiéroglyphiques de l'imprimerie de l'Institut français du Caire, IFAO, Le Caire, 1912.
 Le papyrus médical copte, n°32, MIFAO, Le Caire, 1921.
 Le temple d'Edfou, fasc. 2, Mémoire, IFAO, Le Caire, 1960.
  With F. Daumas, Le temple de Dendara, IFAO, Le Caire, 1965.
  With F. Daumas, Le temple de Dendara, 2 fasc., IFAO, Le Caire, 1972.
  With F. Daumas, Le temple de Dendara, 2 fasc., IFAO, Le Caire, 1978.
  With M. de Rochemonteix, Le temple d'Edfou,  fasc. 1, mémoires publiés par les membres de la mission archéologique française du Caire, IFAO, Le Caire, 1984.
  With M. de Rochemonteix, Le temple d'Edfou,  fasc. 2, mémoires publiés par les membres de la mission archéologique française du Caire, IFAO, Le Caire, 1984.
  With M. de Rochemonteix, Le temple d'Edfou,  fasc. 3, mémoires publiés par les membres de la mission archéologique française du Caire, IFAO, Le Caire, 1987.
  With M. de Rochemonteix, Le temple d'Edfou,  fasc. 4, mémoires publiés par les membres de la mission archéologique française du Caire, IFAO, Le Caire, 1987.
 Le Temple de Dendara, 2 fasc., PIFAO, IFAO, Le Caire, 1987.
 Le temple d'Edfou,  fasc. 1, MIFAO, Le Caire, 1987.
 Le temple d'Edfou, fasc. 2, Mémoire, IFAO, Le Cair

References

French Egyptologists
1868 births
1948 deaths
Members of the Institut Français d'Archéologie Orientale